Tarr is a modernist novel by Wyndham Lewis.

Tarr may also refer to:

 Black Jack Tarr, a fictional character in the Marvel Universe
 Mount Tarr, a mountain of Antarctica

People with the surname Tarr:

 Béla Tarr (born 1955), Hungarian film director and screenwriter
 Bruce Tarr (21st century), member of the Massachusetts Senate
 Christian Tarr (1765-1833), member of the U.S. House of Representatives from Pennsylvania
 Don Tarr (1910-1980), Wales international rugby union player
 Edward Tarr (1936–2020), American trumpet player and musicologist
 Eric Tarr (born 1972), member of the West Virginia Senate
 J. L. Tarr (1919-2008), Bronze Wolf awardee
 Jerry Tarr (born 1939), former collegiate and professional American football player
 Judith Tarr (born 1955), American author
 Michael J. Tarr, American cognitive neuroscientist 
 Peri Tarr (21st century), IBM employee
 Ralph Stockman Tarr (1864-1912), American geographer
 Ron Tarr (1936-1997), British actor
 Wrex Tarr (1934-2006), Rhodesian comedian, news presenter and archer

See also 
 Burke-Tarr
 Tar (disambiguation)
 Tarr-Bay
 Tarr Steps
 Tarr-Hostigos

German-language surnames